Football Club Legnago Salus (formerly Associazione Calcio Legnago Salus) is an Italian football club located in Legnago, Veneto.

It currently plays in Serie C.

History
The club was founded in 1921 and changed name many times.

In 1945–46 season Legnago won its Serie C group, but lost the promotional play-off to get the access to Serie B championship. The club played in the IV Serie (now called Serie D) during three different periods: from 1952 to 1954, then from 1971 to 1980, and from 1993 to 2002.

In the 1971–72 Serie D season, Legnago ended the championship in second place and gained access to the promotion playoffs, then lost 1–0 to Vigevano. The match was played at Stadio Mario Rigamonti in Brescia in front of 7,000 spectators.

In the season 1994–95, Legnago ended in third place behind Treviso and Triestina with Gigi Manganotti as manager. On 30 November 1997 Legnago signed the record number of 1,200 spectators attending the match versus Trento.

After a long period in Serie D, the club relegated to Eccellenza in 2002 and Promozione one year later.

In the 2006–07 season Legnago won the Promozione league and gained promotion to Eccellenza Lombardy.

In the 2009–10 season Legnago won the Eccellenza Lombardy league and gained promotion to Serie D.

F.C. Legnago Salus SSD
On 30 June 2011, A.C. Legnago Salus changed its denomination to F.C. Legnago Salus SSD.

In the 2011–12 season the club gained access to the semifinal of Serie D promotion play-off, where it was eliminated by SandonàJesolo.

In the 2019–20 season, Legnago ended in second place behind Campodarsego, being successively admitted to Serie C due to the latter's renouncing to promotion.

Players

Current squad
.

References

External links
Official Website

Football clubs in Italy
Football clubs in Veneto
Association football clubs established in 1921
Serie C clubs
1921 establishments in Italy